Pedro Albizu Campos (September 12, 1891 – April 21, 1965) was a Puerto Rican attorney and politician, and the leading figure in the Puerto Rican independence movement. He was a polyglot, having spoke 6 languages. He graduated from Harvard Law School with the highest grade point average in his law class, an achievement that earned him the right to give the valedictorian speech at his graduation ceremony. However, animus towards his mixed racial heritage led to his professors delaying two of his final exams in order to keep Albizu Campos from graduating on time. During his time at Harvard University he became involved in the Irish struggle for independence.

Albizu Campos was the president and spokesperson of the Nationalist Party of Puerto Rico from 1930 until his death in 1965. Because of his oratorical skill, he was hailed as El Maestro (The Teacher). He was imprisoned twenty-six years for attempting to overthrow the United States government in Puerto Rico.

In 1950, he planned and called for armed uprisings in several cities in Puerto Rico. Afterward he was convicted and imprisoned again. He died in 1965 shortly after his pardon and release from federal prison, some time after suffering a stroke. There is controversy over his medical treatment in prison.

Early life and education
He was born in a sector of Barrio Machuelo Abajo in Ponce, Puerto Rico to Juana Campos, a domestic worker of African ancestry, on 12 September 1891. His father Alejandro Albizu Romero, known as "El Vizcaíno," was a Basque merchant, from a family of Spanish immigrants who had temporarily resided in Venezuela From an educated family, Albizu was the nephew of the danza composer Juan Morel Campos, and cousin of Puerto Rican educator Dr. Carlos Albizu Miranda. The boy's mother died when he was young and his father did not acknowledge him until he was at Harvard University.

Albizu Campos graduated from Ponce High School, a "public school for the city's white elite." In 1912, Albizu was awarded a scholarship to study Chemical Engineering at the University of Vermont. In 1913, he transferred to Harvard University so as to continue his studies.

At the outbreak of World War I, Albizu Campos volunteered in the United States Infantry. Albizu was commissioned a Second Lieutenant in the Army Reserves and sent to the City of Ponce, where he organized the town's Home Guard. He was called to serve in the regular Army and sent to Camp Las Casas for further training. Upon completing the training, he was assigned to the 375th Infantry Regiment. The United States Army, then segregated, assigned Puerto Ricans of recognizably African descent as soldiers to the all-black units, such as the 375th Regiment. Officers were men classified as white. Albizu Campos was black.

Albizu Campos was honorably discharged from the Army in 1919, with the rank of First Lieutenant. However, his exposure to racism during his time in the U.S. military altered his perspective on U.S.- Puerto Rico relations, and he became the leading advocate for Puerto Rican independence.

In 1919, Albizu returned to his studies at Harvard University, where he was elected president of the Harvard Cosmopolitan Club. He met with foreign students and world leaders, such as Subhas Chandra Bose, the Indian Nationalist leader, and the Hindu poet Rabindranath Tagore. He became interested in the cause of Indian independence and also helped to establish several centers in Boston for Irish independence. Through this work, Albizu Campos met the Irish leader Éamon de Valera and later became a consultant in the drafting of the constitution of the Irish Free State. Also while at Harvard University he co-founded the university's Knights of Columbus chapter along with other Catholic students.

Albizu graduated from Harvard Law School in 1921 while simultaneously studying literature, philosophy, Chemical Engineering, and Military Science at Harvard College. He was fluent in six modern and two classical languages: English, Spanish, French, German, Portuguese, Italian, Latin, and ancient Greek.

Upon graduation from law school, Albizu Campos was recruited for prestigious positions, including a law clerkship to the U.S. Supreme Court, a diplomatic post with the U.S. State Department, the regional vice-presidency (Caribbean region) of a U.S. agricultural syndicate, and a tenured faculty appointment to the University of Puerto Rico.

On June 23, 1921, after graduating from Harvard Law School, Albizu returned to Puerto Rico—but without his law diploma. He had been the victim of racial discrimination by one of his professors. He delayed Albizu Campos' third-year final exams for courses in Evidence and Corporations.  Albizu was about to graduate with the highest grade-point average in his entire law school class. As such, he was scheduled to give the valedictory speech during the graduation ceremonies. His professor delayed his exams so that he could not complete his work, and avoided the "embarrassment" of a Puerto Rican law valedictorian.

Albizu Campos left the United States, took and passed the required two exams in Puerto Rico, and in June 1922 received his law degree by mail. He passed the bar exam and was admitted to the bar in Puerto Rico on February 11, 1924.

Marriage
In 1922, Albizu married Dr. Laura Meneses, a Peruvian biochemist whom he had met at Harvard University. They had four children named Pedro, Laura, Rosa Emilia, and Héctor.

Historical context
After nearly four hundred years of colonial domination under the Spanish Empire, Puerto Rico finally received its colonial autonomy in 1898 through a Carta de Autonomía (Charter of Autonomy). This Charter of Autonomy was signed by Spanish Prime Minister Práxedes Mateo Sagasta and ratified by the Spanish Cortes.

Despite this, just a few months later, the United States claimed ownership of the island as part of the Treaty of Paris, which concluded the Spanish–American War. Persons opposed to the takeover over the years joined in what became the Puerto Rican Nationalist Party. Their position was that, as a matter of international law, the Treaty of Paris could not empower the Spanish to "give" to the United States what was no longer theirs.

Several years after leaving Puerto Rico, in 1913 Charles Herbert Allen, the former first civilian U.S. governor of the island, became president of the American Sugar Refining Company, the largest of its kind in the world. In 1915, he resigned to reduce his responsibilities, but stayed on the board. This company was later renamed as the Domino Sugar company. According to historian Federico Ribes Tovar, Charles Allen leveraged his governorship of Puerto Rico into a controlling interest over the entire Puerto Rican economy.

Early career

Puerto Rican Nationalist Party leadership

Nationalist activists wanted independence from foreign banks, absentee plantation owners, and United States colonial rule. Accordingly, they started organizing in Puerto Rico.

In 1919, José Coll y Cuchí, a member of the Union Party of Puerto Rico, took followers with him to form the Nationalist Association of Puerto Rico in San Juan, to work for independence. They gained legislative approval to repatriate the remains of Ramón Emeterio Betances, the Puerto Rican patriot, from Paris, France.

By the 1920s, two other pro-independence organizations had formed on the Island: the Nationalist Youth and the Independence Association of Puerto Rico. The Independence Association was founded by José S. Alegría, Eugenio Font Suárez and Leopoldo Figueroa in 1920. On September 17, 1922, these three political organizations joined forces and formed the Puerto Rican Nationalist Party. Coll y Cuchi was elected president and José S. Alegría (father of Ricardo Alegría) vice president.

In 1924, Pedro Albizu Campos joined the Puerto Rican Nationalist Party and was elected vice president. In 1927, Albizu Campos traveled to Santo Domingo, Haiti, Cuba, Mexico, Panama, Peru, and Venezuela, seeking support among other Latin Americans for the Puerto Rican Independence movement.

In 1930, Albizu and José Coll y Cuchí, president of the Party, disagreed on how the party should be run. Albizu Campos did not like what he considered to be Coll y Cuchí's attitude of fraternal solidarity with the enemy. As a result, Coll y Cuchí left the party and, with some of his followers, returned to the Union Party. On May 11, 1930, Albizu Campos was elected president of the Puerto Rican Nationalist Party. He formed the first Women's Nationalist Committee, in the island municipality of Vieques, Puerto Rico.

After being elected party president, Albizu declared: "I never believed in numbers. Independence will instead be achieved by the intensity of those that devote themselves totally to the Nationalist ideal." Under the slogan, "La Patria es valor y sacrificio" (The Homeland is valor and sacrifice), a new campaign of national affirmation was carried out. Albizu Campos' vision of sacrifice was integrated with his Catholic faith.

Accusation against Dr. Cornelius P. Rhoads

In 1932, Albizu published a letter accusing Dr. Cornelius P. Rhoads, an American pathologist with the Rockefeller Institute, of killing Puerto Rican patients in San Juan's Presbyterian Hospital as part of his medical research. Albizu Campos had been given an unmailed letter by Rhoads addressed to a colleague, found after Rhoads returned to the United States.

Part of what Rhoads wrote, in a letter to his friend which began by complaining about another's job appointment, included the following:

Albizu sent copies of the letter to the League of Nations, the Pan American Union, the American Civil Liberties Union, newspapers, embassies, and the Vatican. He also sent copies of the Rhoads letter to the media, and published his own letter in the Porto Rico Progress. He used it as an opportunity to attack United States imperialism, writing:

A scandal erupted. Rhoads had already returned to New York. Governor James R. Beverley of Puerto Rico and his attorney general Ramón Quiñones, as well as Puerto Rican medical doctors Morales and Otero appointed thereby, conducted an investigation of the more than 250 cases treated during the period of Rhoads' work at Presbyterian Hospital. The Rockefeller Foundation also conducted their own investigation. Rhoads said he had written the letter in anger after he found his car vandalized, and it was intended "as a joke" in private with his colleague. An investigation concluded that he had conducted his research and treatment of Puerto Ricans appropriately. When the matter was revisited in 2002, again no evidence was found of medical mistreatment. The American Association for Cancer Research (AACR) considered the letter offensive enough to remove Rhoads' name from a prize established to honor his lifelong work in cancer research.

Early Nationalist efforts

The Nationalist Party obtained poor electoral results in the 1932 election, but continued its campaign to unite the island behind an independent Puerto Rico platform. In 1933, Albizu Campos led a strike against the Puerto Rico Railway and Light and Power Company for its alleged monopoly on the island. The following year he represented sugar cane workers as a lawyer in a suit against the United States sugar industry.

The Nationalist movement was intensified by some of its members being killed by police during unrest at the University of Puerto Rico in 1935, in what was called the Río Piedras Massacre. The police were commanded by Colonel E. Francis Riggs, a former United States Army officer. Albizu withdrew the Nationalist Party from electoral politics, saying they would not participate until the United States ended colonial rule.

In 1936, Hiram Rosado and Elías Beauchamp, two members of the Cadets of the Republic, the Nationalist youth organization, assassinated Colonel Riggs. After their arrest, they were killed without a trial at police headquarters in San Juan.

Other police killed marchers and bystanders at a parade in the Ponce massacre (1937). The Nationalists believed these showed the violence which the United States was prepared to use in order to maintain its colonial regime in Puerto Rico. Historians Manuel Maldonado-Denis and César Ayala believe the motive for this repression, especially during the Great Depression, was because United States business interests were earning such enormous profits by this colonial arrangement.

First arrest
After these events, on April 3, 1936, a federal grand jury submitted an indictment against Albizu Campos, Juan Antonio Corretjer, Luis F. Velázquez, Clemente Soto Vélez and the following members of the cadets: Erasmo Velázquez, Julio H. Velázquez, Rafael Ortiz Pacheco, Juan Gallardo Santiago, and Pablo Rosado Ortiz. They were charged with sedition and other violations of federal law proscribing subversive activities.

The prosecution based some of its charges on the Nationalists' creation and organization of the Cadets, which the government referred to as the "Liberating Army of Puerto Rico". The prosecutors said that the military tactics which the cadets were taught were for the purpose of overthrowing the Government of the United States. A jury of seven Puerto Ricans and five Americans was unable to reach a unanimous verdict, voting 7-to-5 for acquittal. Following the hung jury, Judge Robert A. Cooper permitted a retrial. The second jury was composed of ten Americans and two Puerto Ricans. Following trial, this jury concluded that the defendants were guilty.

In 1937, a group of lawyers, including a young Gilberto Concepción de Gracia, appealed the case, but the 1st Circuit U.S. Court of Appeals, which held appellate jurisdiction, upheld the verdict. Albizu Campos and the other Nationalist leaders were sentenced to the Federal penitentiary in Atlanta.

In 1939, United States Congressman Vito Marcantonio, strongly criticized the proceedings, calling the trial a "frame-up" and "one of the blackest pages in the history of American jurisprudence." In his speech Five Years of Tyranny in Puerto Rico, Congressman Marcantonio said that Albizu's jury had been profoundly prejudiced since it had been hand-picked by the prosecuting attorney Cecil Snyder. According to Marcantonio, the jury consisted of people "...who had expressed publicly bias and hatred for the defendants." He said Snyder had been told that "the Department of Justice would back him until he did get a conviction."

Marcantonio argued for Puerto Rican rights, saying "As long as Puerto Rico remains part of the United States, Puerto Rico must have the same freedom, the same civil liberties, and the same justice which our forefathers laid down for us. Only a complete and immediate unconditional pardon will, in a very small measure, right this historical wrong."

In 1943, Albizu Campos became seriously ill and had to be interned at the Columbus Hospital of New York. He stayed there until nearly the end of his sentence. In 1947, after eleven years of imprisonment, Albizu was released; he returned to Puerto Rico. Within a short period of time, he began preparing for an armed struggle against the United States' plan to turn Puerto Rico into a "commonwealth" of the United States.

Later career

Passage of the Gag Law
In 1948, the Puerto Rican Senate passed Law 53, also called the Ley de la Mordaza (Gag Law). At the time, members of the Partido Popular Democrático (Popular Democratic Party), or PPD, occupied almost all the Senate seats, and Luis Muñoz Marín presided over the chamber.

The bill was signed into law on June 10, 1948, by the United States-appointed governor of Puerto Rico Jesús T. Piñero. It closely resembled the anti-communist Smith Law passed in the United States.

The law made it illegal to own or display a Puerto Rican flag anywhere, even in one's own home. It limited speech against the United States government or in favor of Puerto Rican independence and prohibited one to print, publish, sell or exhibit any material intended to paralyze or destroy the insular government or to organize any society, group or assembly of people with a similar destructive intent. Anyone accused and found guilty of disobeying the law could be sentenced to ten years imprisonment, a fine of $10,000 dollars (US), or both.

Dr. Leopoldo Figueroa, then a member of the Partido Estadista Puertorriqueño (Puerto Rican Statehood Party) and the only non-PPD member of the Puerto Rico House of Representatives, spoke out against the law, saying that it was repressive and in direct violation of the First Amendment of the United States Constitution, which guarantees Freedom of Speech. Figueroa noted that since Puerto Ricans had been granted United States citizenship they were covered by its constitutional protections.

1950s uprisings and second arrest

Pedro Albizu Campos was jailed again after the October 30, 1950 Nationalist revolts, known as the Puerto Rican Nationalist Party Revolts of the 1950s, in various Puerto Rican cities and towns against United States rule. Among the more notable of the revolts was the Jayuya uprising, where a group of Puerto Rican Nationalists, under the leadership of Blanca Canales, held the town of Jayuya for three days; the Utuado uprising which culminated in what is known as the "Utuado Massacre"; and the attack on La Fortaleza (the Puerto Rican governor's mansion) during the Nationalist attack of San Juan.

On October 31, police officers and National Guardsmen surrounded Salón Boricua, a barbershop in Santurce. Believing that a group of Nationalists were inside the shop, they opened fire. The only person in the shop was Albizu Campos' personal barber, Vidal Santiago Díaz. Santiago Díaz fought alone against the attackers for three hours and received five bullet wounds, including one in the head. The entire gunfight was transmitted "live" via the radio airwaves, and was heard all over the island. Overnight Santiago Díaz, the barber who survived an armed attack by forty police and National Guardsmen, became a legend throughout Puerto Rico.

During the revolt, Albizu was at the Nationalist Party's headquarters in Old San Juan, which also served as his residence. That day he was accompanied by Juan José Muñoz Matos, Doris Torresola Roura (cousin of Blanca Canales and sister of Griselio Torresola), and Carmen María Pérez Roque. The occupants of the building were surrounded by the police and the National Guard who, without warning, fired their weapons. Doris Torresola, who was shot and wounded, was carried out during a ceasefire by Muñoz Matos and Pérez Roque. Alvaro Rivera Walker, a friend of Pedro Albizu Campos, somehow made his way to the Nationalist leader. He stayed with Albizu Campos until the next day when they were attacked with gas. Rivera Walker then raised a white towel he attached to a pole and surrendered. All the Nationalists, including Albizu, were arrested.

On November 1, 1950, Nationalists Oscar Collazo and Griselio Torresola attacked Blair House in Washington, D.C. where president Harry S. Truman was staying while the White House was being renovated. During the attack on the president, Torresola and a policeman, Private Leslie Coffelt, were killed.

Because of this assassination attempt, Pedro Albizu Campos was immediately attacked at his home. After a shootout with the police, Albizu Campos was arrested and sentenced to eighty years in prison. Over the next few days, 3,000 independence supporters were arrested all over the island.

Lolita Lebrón and third arrest
Albizu was pardoned in 1953 by then-governor Luis Muñoz Marín but the pardon was revoked the following year after the 1954 United States Capitol shooting incident, when four Puerto Rican Nationalists, led by Lolita Lebrón, opened fire from the gallery of the Capitol Building in Washington, D.C.

Though in ill health, Pedro Albizu Campos was arrested when Lolita Lebrón, Rafael Cancel Miranda, Andrés Figueroa Cordero, and Irvin Flores, unfurled a Puerto Rican flag and opened fire on the members of the 83rd Congress on March 1, 1954, with the intention of capturing world-wide attention to the cause of Puerto Rican independence.

Ruth Mary Reynolds, the American Nationalist, went to the defense of Albizu Campos and the four Nationalists involved in the shooting incident with the aid of the American League for Puerto Rico's Independence.

Later years and death
During his imprisonment, Albizu suffered deteriorating health. He alleged that he was the subject of human radiation experiments in prison and said that he could see colored rays bombarding him. When he wrapped wet towels around his head in order to shield himself from the radiation, the prison guards ridiculed him as El Rey de las Toallas (The King of the Towels).

Officials suggested that Pedro Albizu Campos was suffering from mental illness, but other prisoners at La Princesa prison including Francisco Matos Paoli, Roberto Díaz and Juan Jaca, claimed that they felt the effects of radiation on their own bodies as well.

Dr. Orlando Daumy, a radiologist and president of the Cuban Cancer Association, traveled to Puerto Rico to examine him. From his direct physical examination of Albizu Campos, Dr. Daumy reached three specific conclusions: 
1) that the sores on Albizu Campos were produced by radiation burns 
2) that his symptoms corresponded to those of a person who had received intense radiation, 
3) that wrapping himself in wet towels was the best way to diminish the intensity of the rays.

The FBI investigated any doctors who planned to visit and diagnose Pedro Albizu Campos. Dr. Nacine Hanoka (Miami Beach, FL), was thoroughly investigated. In one FBI memo to J. Edgar Hoover regarding Dr. Hanoka, an instruction near the end of the memo stated "The Miami office is requested to identify Dr. HANOKA, determine whether he made a trip to Puerto Rico since 9/30/53, and furnish any subversive information concerning him."

In 1956, Albizu suffered a stroke in prison and was transferred to San Juan's Presbyterian Hospital under police guard.

On November 15, 1964, on the brink of death, Pedro Albizu Campos was pardoned by Governor Luis Muñoz Marín. He died on April 21, 1965. More than 75,000 Puerto Ricans were part of a procession that accompanied his body for burial in the Old San Juan Cemetery.

Legacy

Pedro Albizu Campos's legacy is the subject of discussion among supporters and detractors. Lolita Lebrón called him "Puerto Rico's most visionary leader" and nationalists consider him "one of the island's greatest patriots of the 20th century." In describing his legacy, social scientist Juan Manuel Carrión wrote that "Albizu still represents a forceful challenge to the very fabric of [Puerto Rico's] colonial political order." His followers state that Albizu's political and military actions served as a primer for positive change in Puerto Rico, including the improvement of labor conditions for peasants and workers, a more accurate assessment of the colonial relationship between Puerto Rico and the United States, and an awareness by the political establishment in Washington, D.C. of this colonial relationship.  Supporters state that the legacy is that of an exemplary sacrifice for the building of the Puerto Rican nation ... a legacy of resistance to colonial rule. His critics say that he "failed to attract and offer concrete solutions to the struggling poor and working class people and thus was unable to spread the revolution to the masses."

The revival of public observance of the Grito de Lares and its significant icons was a result of Albizu Campos's efforts as the leader of the Puerto Rican Nationalist Party.

FBI files on Albizu Campos
In the 2000s, Federal Bureau of Investigation (FBI) files released under the Freedom of Information Act, revealed that the San Juan FBI office coordinated with FBI offices in New York, Chicago and other cities, in a decades-long surveillance of Albizu and Puerto Ricans who had contact or communication with him. These documents are viewable online, including some as recent as 1965.

Honors

Albizu Campos has been the subject of hundreds of books and countless articles. He has also been honored both in the United States and in Puerto Rico in many ways:
In Chicago, an alternative high school is named the Dr. Pedro Albizu Campos High School.
 La Casa de Don Pedro in Newark, New Jersey is named after him.
In New York City the Campos Plaza Community Center and housing project in Manhattan are named after him. 
In New York City, Public School 161 in Harlem is named after him.
In Puerto Rico, there are streets in most municipalities named after him.
In Ponce, there is a Pedro Albizu Campos Park and lifesize statue dedicated to his memory. Every September 12, his contributions to Puerto Rico are remembered at this park on the celebration of his birthday.
In Salinas, there is a "Plaza Monumento Don Pedro Albizu Campos", a plaza and 9-foot statue dedicated to his memory. It was dedicated on January 11, 2013, the birth day of Eugenio María de Hostos, another Puerto Rican who struggled for Puerto Rico's independence. Quite unique among Puerto Rican thought, the plaza-monument was erected and dedicated by a municipal government of the opposite (statehood) political ideology as that of Albizu Campos.
In 1993, Chicago alderman Billy Ocasio, in supporting a statue of Albizu Campos in Humboldt Park, likened him to such American leaders as Patrick Henry, Chief Crazy Horse, John Brown, Frederick Douglass, and W. E. B. Du Bois.

Gallery

See also
Puerto Ricans in World War I
San Juan Nationalist revolt
Puerto Rican Independence Party

References

Further reading
Acosta, Ivonne, La Mordaza/Puerto Rico 1948–1957. Río Piedras, Puerto Rico, 1987
Connerly, Charles, ed. Dr. Pedro Albizu Campos, Vieques Times, Puerto Rico, 1995
Corretjer, Juan Antonio, El Líder De La Desesperación, Guaynabo, Puerto Rico, 1978
García, Marvin, Dr. Pedro Albizu Campos, National Louis University
Torres Santiago, José M., 100 Years of Don Pedro Albizu Campos
"War Against All Puerto Ricans: Revolution and Terror in America's Colony"; Author: Nelson Antonio Denis; Publisher: Nation Books (April 7, 2015); .

External links

Five Years of Tyranny in Puerto Rico. Vito Marcantonio. August 14, 1939. Accessed 19 January 2022. Archived.
Joan Klein, Oncology Times Interview: "Susan B. Horwitz, PhD, Finishes Term (Plus!!) As AACR President!/Cornelius P. Rhoads Controversy", Oncology Times, 25 July 2003, Vol. 25 – Issue 14, pp. 41–42
"Pedro Albizu Campos", Portraits of Notable Individuals in the Struggle for Puerto Rican Independence, Peace Host website
Pedro Albizu Campos Archive at marxists.org
"Human Radiation Experiments", US Department of Energy, 1994
"Pedro Albizu Campos" Biografias y Vidas
Habla Albizu Campos, Paredon Records, Smithsonian Institution
¿Quién Es Albizu Campos? (Who is Albizu Campos?), Film Documentary website, not in distribution
"War Against All Puerto Ricans: Inside the US Crackdown on Pedro Albizu Campos and the Nationalist Party" Democracy Now!, 21 April 2015

1891 births
1965 deaths
COINTELPRO targets
Puerto Rican nationalists
Burials at Santa María Magdalena de Pazzis Cemetery
Puerto Rican military officers
Anti-imperialism
Albizu-Campos, Pedro
Puerto Rican Army personnel
Puerto Rican Nationalist Party politicians
United States Army officers
United States Army personnel of World War I
University of Vermont alumni
Puerto Rican party leaders
Pardon recipients
Puerto Rican people of Spanish descent
Puerto Rican people of African descent
Puerto Rican prisoners and detainees
Puerto Rican Roman Catholics
Imprisoned Puerto Rican independence activists
Politicians from Ponce
Nationalists from Ponce
Puerto Rican independence activists
Puerto Rican rebels